The Myanmar Mercatile Marine College (M.M.M.C), located in Yangon, Myanmar, is a public institute offering mainly two-year diplomas in mercantile nautical technologies. The institute also offers four-year bachelor's degrees and post-graduate diplomas in select fields.

The institute aims  to "train seafarers to become internationally recognized marine personnel, so that they can be employed onboard vessels owned by national and foreign shipping companies".

History
The institute's origins trace to the Nautical and Engineering cadet courses conducted at the Naval Training School in Seikyi, Yangon Division beginning in 1963 under the joint auspices of Ministry of Defence, Ministry of Education, and Ministry of Transport. In 1971, the precursor school to the IMT, Mercantile Marine Training School was established. In 1972, the school became the Institute of Marine Technology, and was then solely put under Ministry of Transport.Now, the name of the school has changed to" Myanmar Mercantile Marine College(M.M.M.C)"and has born out  many qualified marine officer and marine engineer every year.

Programs
The institute offers 47 competency courses, four-year bachelor's degree programs in mercantile marine science and mercantile marine technology, and a post-graduate diploma in maritime transportation and maritime technology. The training courses are based on the International Maritime Organization's STCW-95 standards.

See also
 Myanmar Maritime University

References

Universities and colleges in Yangon
Technological universities in Myanmar
Universities and colleges in Myanmar